Transport in Fukuoka-Kitakyushu is similar to that of other large cities in Japan, but with a high degree of private transport. The region is a hub of international ferry services and has a high degree of air connectivity and a considerable rail transport network, complemented with highways and surface streets.  It includes public and private rail and highway networks; airports for international, domestic, and general aviation; buses; motorcycle delivery services, walking, bicycling, and commercial shipping.  The foci of the public transport system are Hakata Station, Tenjin Station, and Kokura Station, in Fukuoka and Kitakyushu cities respectively.  Between these two cities lies a more sparse weblike regional rail network.

The transit network consists of 32 surface and subterranean railway lines (see section on rail transport) operated by several and private operators. Monorails, trams, fixed-guideway lines and buses support this primary rail network.  Like other cities in Japan, walking and bicycling is common.

Rail transport

Overview 

The passenger rail network in Fukuoka-Kitakyushu metropolitan area (see also Northern Kyushu) is dense around the cities of Fukuoka and Kitakyushu and Shimonoseki, declining in density between and around the two primary cities.  Passenger railway usage and density is lower than that of Greater Tokyo or Keihanshin, with the region having a little less than 6 million people. Similar to other areas of Japan, few free maps exist of the entire network; only stations of a particular company are shown, along with  key transfer points. The Sanyō Shinkansen serves as the backbone of intercity rail transport connecting Hakata and Kokura Stations to Honshu. Kyūshū Shinkansen lines are completed on March 12, 2011, running to Kagoshima.

There are 33 operating passenger rail lines and a tourist-oriented cable car line in the Fukuoka-Kitakyushu area .

List of passenger railway lines in operation
JR Kyushu and JR West
high-speed rail
Sanyō Shinkansen
Kyūshū Shinkansen
Intercity
Fukuhoku Yutaka Line (Sasaguri Line and Chikuho Main Line)
Gotōji Line
Kagoshima Main Line
Nippo Main Line
Hitahikosan Line
Kashii Line (Uminonakamichi Line)
Chikuhi Line
Hakata Minami Line
Nishi-Nippon Railroad (Nishitetsu)
Tenjin Ōmuta Line
Kaizuka Line
Fukuoka City Subway
Kūkō Line
Hakozaki Line
Nanakuma Line
Amagi Railway Amagi Line
Chikuhō Electric Railroad Line
Heisei Chikuhō Railway
Kitakyūshū Monorail

List of cable car systems in operation
Hobashira Cable

Bridges
The bridge over the Kanmon Straits plays an important connectivity role in the region, supporting automobile, rail, and ferry traffic between Honshu and Kyushu islands.

Road transport

Local and regional highways 

Route 2
Route 3
Route 9
Route 10
Route 34
Route 190
Route 191
Route 198
Route 199
Route 200
Route 201
Route 202
Route 208
Route 209
Route 210

Route 211
Route 263
Route 264
Route 316
Route 322
Route 385
Route 386
Route 442
Route 443
Route 490
Route 491
Route 495
Route 496
Route 497 part of Nishi-Kyūshū Expressway
Route 500

Expressways 
Major area expressways include:
Fukuoka Urban Expressway
Kitakyūshū Urban Expressway
Kyūshū Expressway
Nagasaki Expressway
Ōita Expressway
Nishi-Kyūshū Expressway
Higashi-Kyūshū Expressway
Chugoku Expressway
Sanyō Expressway

Buses 

Several private and public bus companies operate with hundreds of routes throughout the region.  Most local bus routes complement existing rail service to form an effective intermodal transit network.

Air transport

Primary 

Fukuoka Airport is the busiest airport in the region, serving international and domestic flights. Kitakyushu Airport is an international airport built on an artificial island in the Inland Sea, and serves as a major cargo hub for Kityakyushu area factories as well as a relief airport for Fukuoka.

Secondary 
Saga Airport also provide air services to the region.
Just outside the region is Oita Airport and Kumamoto Airport.

There are also a number of Japan Air Self-Defense Force airfields.

Maritime transport
Major area seaports include:
 Port of Hakata
 Port of Shimonoseki
 Port of Kokura
 Port of Shin Moji

Passenger ferries 
See List of ferry operators in Japan.

International
Because of its geographic proximity to Korea and China, the region is the major hub in Japan for international passenger ferries. Pukwan Ferry, Camelia Line, and high-speed ferry Beetle (JR Kyushu), Kobee operate out of both Hakata and Shimonseki, there are also ferry services to Shanghai and Dalian in China, Busan, Ulsan in Korea.

Regional Domestic
There are ferry services to Tsushima Island as well as major Japanese cities (such as Hiroshima, Osaka, Matsuyama, Tokushima, Kōbe and Tokyo) from Fukuoka, Kitakyushu, and Shimonoseki ports.

Cross Strait/Local
Within the Kanmon-Kitakyūshū area, there are three commuter ferry lines: the Wakato Ferry, the Kanmon Straits Ferry, and the Kanmon Straits Liner.  There are services to some small islands near Kitakyushu and Fukuoka from their respective cities as well.

Shipping 
Shipping plays a major role moving freight in and out of the Fukuoka-Kitakyushu area. Finished automobiles for export are handled by ports in the region.  With just-in-time requirements of automobile manufacturers and suppliers, Kitakyūshū Airport plays an important role as a hub for cargo and logistics.

The region is home to three regasification LNG terminals.

Other modes

Greater Fukuoka is little different from the rest of Japan in the other modes of transport.

See also
Transport in Greater Tokyo
Transport in Keihanshin
Transport in Greater Nagoya

References

External links
 Fukuoka-Kitakyushu Railway Network Map 

Transport in Japan
Transport in Fukuoka Prefecture
Transport in Yamaguchi Prefecture